Ronald Reagan (born July 11, 1954) is a Bradenton, Florida insurance agent and Republican politician who served as the representative for District 67 in the House of Representatives of the U.S. state of Florida. He was first elected in 2002 and was re-elected to three successive terms. He was the majority whip. He chaired the Committee on Insurance and the Jobs & Entrepreneurship Council.  He was termed-out in 2010.

Early life
Reagan was born in Norfolk, Virginia on July 11, 1954, and moved to Florida in 1973. He received his Associate of Arts degree from Manatee Community College. In 1977, he attended the University of South Florida.

Florida House of Representatives
In 2002, after winning the primary with 69% of the vote, he defeated a Libertarian and a write-in candidate, running on a platform of local control for education and growth issues. In 2004, he won re-election unopposed.

Since leaving the Florida legislature, Reagan has been the Director of National Advocacy and Outreach for the National Coalition for Safer Roads (NCSR), a Texas nonprofit supported by American Traffic Solutions of Scottsdale, Arizona, a manufacturer and operator of red light camera systems.

Sources
Florida House of Representatives Profile
Project Vote Smart profile

References

Republican Party members of the Florida House of Representatives
1954 births
Living people
People from Bradenton, Florida
Politicians from Norfolk, Virginia
University of South Florida alumni